Helon Habila Ngalabak (born November 1967) is a Nigerian novelist and poet, whose writing has won many prizes, including the Caine Prize in 2001. He worked as a lecturer and journalist in Nigeria before moving in 2002 to England, where he was a Chevening Scholar at the University of East Anglia, and now teaches creative writing at George Mason University, Fairfax, Virginia.

Background

Helon Habila was born in Kaltungo, Gombe State, Nigeria. 
He studied English Language and Literature at the University of Jos and lectured for three years at the Federal Polytechnic, Bauchi. In 1999 he went to Lagos to write for Hints magazine, moving  to Vanguard newspaper as Literary Editor.

Habila won the Music Society of Nigeria (MUSON) national poetry award for his poem "Another Age" in 2000, the same year his short story collection Prison Stories was published. He won the 2001 Caine Prize for a story from that collection, "Love Poems". His first novel, Waiting for an Angel, was published in 2002, and the following year won the Commonwealth Writers' Prize (Africa Region, Best First Book).

Moving to England in 2002, Habila became  African Writing Fellow at the University of East Anglia. In 2005 he was invited by Chinua Achebe to become the first Chinua Achebe Fellow at Bard College, NY, where he spent a year writing and teaching, remaining in the US as a professor of creative writing at George Mason University in Fairfax, Virginia.

In 2006 he co-edited the British Council anthology New Writing 14. His second novel, Measuring Time, published in 2007, was nominated for the Hurston-Wright Legacy Award, the IMPAC Prize, and in 2008 won the Virginia Library Foundation Prize for fiction. His third novel, Oil on Water (2010), which deals with environmental pollution in the oil-rich Nigerian Delta, received generally positive review coverage. Bernardine Evaristo in The Guardian wrote: "Habila's prose perfectly evokes the devastation of the oil-polluted wetlands"; Margaret Busby's review in The Independent said that "Habila has a filmic ability to etch scenes on the imagination", and Aminatta Forna in The Daily Telegraph concluded: "Habila is a skilful narrator and a master of structure." Oil on Water was shortlisted for prizes including the Pen/Open Book Award, Commonwealth Best Book, Africa Region, and the Orion Book Award.  Habila's anthology The Granta Book of the African Short Story came out in September 2011.

Habila is a founding member and currently serves on the advisory board of African Writers Trust, "a non-profit entity which seeks to coordinate and bring together African writers in the Diaspora and writers on the continent to promote sharing of skills and other resources, and to foster knowledge and learning between the two groups."

From July 2013 to June 2014 Habila was a DAAD Fellow in Berlin, Germany.

He was appointed chair of the judging panel for the 2016 Etisalat Prize for Literature.

Helon Habila was shortlisted for the Grand Prix of Literary Associations 2019, with his work entitled Travelers.

Early inspiration for writing 
Growing up in a period of political dysfunction and military dictatorships, Helon Habila as a teenager in the 1980s was motivated to rebel and fight against this notion. Writing became his voice and a means of protest. It provided an avenue to express himself and his beliefs. Many times, he has tried to step away from his usual fight against injustice and write about different unrelated topics. Nevertheless, he has been unable to and stick to writing to reject injustice, oppression, and exploitation.

Cordite publishing company 
Cordite Books is a new publishing company jointly owned by Habila and Parrésia Publishers. Their first project was to make a call for submissions in 2013 for quality crime fiction manuscripts, the best to receive US$1,000 and a publishing deal with distribution across the continent.

In his early days, Habila grew up reading Nigerian books in Hausa and then Macmillan's Pacesetters series, which was popular pan-African fiction mostly about crime in urban areas. This resonated with the actual happenings in cities where there is always a fight for power, a struggle to be important and issues of class. This setting has been a recurring scene in his life.

With this interest in crime fiction, Helon noticed a gap in the market as a lot of books in Nigeria were by serious literary writers such as Chinua Achebe. After that you would only find non-fiction, religious or motivational books. There was hardly any middle ground for entertainment books and that is where Cordite Books fills the gap for crime fiction.

Awards and honors
2000 Music Society of Nigeria (MUSON) national poetry award
2001 Caine Prize, "Love Poems"
2003 Commonwealth Writers' Prize, Africa category, Waiting for an Angel
2007 Emily Clark Balch Prize (short story), from Virginia Quarterly Review, "The Hotel Malogo"
2008 Library of Virginia Literary Award for Fiction, Measuring Time
2011 Commonwealth Writers Prize, shortlist, Oil on Water
2012 Orion Book Award, shortlist, Oil on Water
2012 PEN/Open Book Award, shortlist, Oil on Water
2015 Windham–Campbell Literature Prize (Fiction) valued at $150,000
2019 Grand Prix of Literary Associations, Shortlisted with Travelers.
2020 James Tait Black Memorial Prize, shortlist, Travelers.

Bibliography
 Prison Stories (2000), Epik Books
 Waiting for an Angel: A Novel (2004), Penguin Books. 
 New Writing 14 (2006), Granta Books (co-edited with Lavinia Greenlaw).
 Measuring Time: A Novel (2007), W. W. Norton & Company. .
 Dreams, Miracles, and Jazz: An Anthology of New Africa Fiction (2007), Pan Macmillan (co-edited with Kadija George).
 Oil on Water: A Novel (2010), Hamish Hamilton, . Published in the US (2011) by W. W. Norton & Company, 
 The Granta Book of the African Short Story (2011), Granta. ; 
 The Chibok Girls (2016), Penguin Books. , 
 Travelers: A Novel (2019), W. W. Norton & Company.

Further reading 
 Press Release for "Writing Africa", panel held at Bard College with Chinua Achebe, Kofi Anyidoho, Emmanuel Dongala, Helon Habila and Caryl Phillips, September 2005.
 "The Making of Habila's 'Waiting For An Angel' — A Review" by Isaac Attah Ogezi (African Writer, 9 September 2009), mentions how his love of literature endeared him to undergraduate lecturers such as Obiwu, who in his poetry collection Rituals of the Sun referred to Habila and Toni Kan as his "literary soul-mates".

References

External links 
 Helon Habila's website
 Frank Bures, "Everything Follows: An Interview With Helon Habila", Poets & Writers, January/February 2003
 "Helon Habila" Webcast at the Library of Congress, 1 May 2012.
 Helon Habila profile at The Guardian
 Kenneth Okpomo, "In Pursuit of a Trailblazing Storyteller", Thresholds.

1967 births
Living people
Alumni of the University of East Anglia
George Mason University faculty
Nigerian male novelists
University of Jos alumni
Nigerian male poets
People from Gombe State
21st-century Nigerian novelists
Bard College faculty
Nigerian expatriate academics in the United States
Caine Prize winners
International Writing Program alumni
Nigerian publishers (people)
21st-century male writers
21st-century Nigerian poets
Chevening Scholars